The 2010–11 McNeese State Cowboys basketball team represented McNeese State University in the 2010–11 NCAA Division I men's basketball season. The Cowboys, led by head coach Dave Simmons, played their home games at the Burton Coliseum in Lake Charles, Louisiana, as members of the Southland Conference. The Cowboys were regular-season champions in the Southland Conference, eventually advancing to the championship game of the Southland Conference tournament, where they were defeated by UTSA.

McNeese State failed to qualify for the NCAA tournament, but received an automatic bid to the 2011 NIT as the regular-season champions of the Southland. The Cowboys were eliminated in the first round of the NIT by Boston College, 82–64.

Roster 

Source

Schedule and results

|-
!colspan=9 style=|Regular season

|-
!colspan=9 style=| Southland tournament

|-
!colspan=9 style=| NIT

Source

References

McNeese Cowboys basketball seasons
McNeese State
McNeese State
McNeese State Cowboys basketball
McNeese State Cowboys basketball